Cuenca is a surname. Notable people with the surname include:

César Cuenca (born 1981), Argentine boxer
Christina Cuenca (born 1980), American beauty queen
Isaac Cuenca (born 1991), Spanish footballer
Jake Cuenca (born 1987), American-born Filipino actor
Jean-José Cuenca (born 1986), French footballer
João Paulo Cuenca (born 1978), Brazilian writer
Luis Cuenca (1921–2004), Spanish actor
María Guadalupe Cuenca (1790-1854), Bolivian-born Argentine letter writer
Mario Cuenca (born 1975), Argentine footballer
Rodolfo Cuenca (born 1928),Filipino businessman 
Victoria Cuenca, 20th-century Argentine actress, vedette
 Mike Cuenca, an American film director